List of metropolitan areas in Switzerland. Switzerland has five metropolitan areas as defined by Swiss Federal Statistics Office:

Metropolitan areas 

 Basel metropolitan area
 Bern metropolitan area (Espace Mittelland)
 Geneva metropolitan area (≈ Grand Genève)
 Lausanne metropolitan area
 Zürich metropolitan area

See also 
List of cities in Switzerland

References

External links 
 Polycentricity and metropolitan governance in Switzerland, Vienna University of Economics and Business
 Metropolitan governance and the "democratic deficit", Swiss Federal Institute of Technology in Lausanne

 
Switzerland
Metropolitan areas